Lucien de la Hodde (born 1808 in France) became a writer and a member of various secret revolutionary societies in France during the Restoration of Louis XVIII and during the July Monarchy of Louis Phillipe.  Later he became a police agent.  Lucien de la Hodde died in 1865.

References

1808 births
1865 deaths
French male writers